Okapi Aalst is a Belgian professional basketball club from Aalst, Belgium. The club competes in the top tier BNXT League and plays its home games in the Okapi Forum, which has a seating capacity of 2,800 people.

Okapi is a long-time participant of the Belgian first division, is the owner of one Belgian Cup and two Supercups. As well, Aalst was a regular participant in European competitions in the past.

In its history the team has included many quality players who would be named Belgian League MVP or have played for top Euroleague and NBA teams, such as Chris Copeland and Matt Lojeski.

History
Okapi was founded on 15 November 1949 by a group of friends in Aalst, almost all going to the school named Aalsterse Athenuem. Piet de Coninck van Noyen was one of the founders. In 1956, Odilon Ringoir became the first chairman of the club. In 1957, the municipality of Aalst allowed the team to play outside at the Hopmarkt and as a result more spectators watched the team's matches. In the winter months, the team played inside a shoe factory in Terjoden. In the 1958–59 season, Okapi promoted to the fourth national league. In 1969, the first foreign players where signed to keep up with opposing teams.

In the 1969–70 season, Okapi won the national second division title in an impressive way by going unbeaten in all 44 games. In the 1970–71 season, the club made its maiden debut at the First National League. The team stayed there for five years until it was relegated again. The downfall lasted shortly as the team promoted back the next season. In the following seasons, Okapi enjoyed the first league in which local Derbys against Black Boys Aalst were played. In 1980, the team relegated once again.

In the 2011–12 season, Aalstar won its first trophy ever with its Belgian Basketball Cup victory. Okapi defeated Antwerp Giants 96–89 after overtime. By winning the Cup, Okapi qualified for the Belgian Supercup the next season, which it also won after defeating BC Oostende. In 2013, Okapi won the Supercup for the second consecutive year by beating Oostende once again.

In the 2013–14 season, Okapi reached the Finals of the Belgian League for the first time. In the Finals, the team was swept by Oostende, which went on to win its third straight title.

In June 2020, the team changed its name from Okapi Aalstar back to Okapi Aalst. Since the 2021–22 season, Okapi plays in the BNXT League, in which the national leagues of Belgium and the Netherlands have been merged.

Honours and titles
Belgian League:
Runners-up (1): 2013–14

Belgian Cup
 Winners (1): 2011–12
Runners-up (3): 1963–64, 1997–98, 2012–13

Belgian Supercup
Winners (2): 2012, 2013

Belgian Second Division
Winners (1): 2005–06

Season by season

Logos

Players

Current roster

Depth chart

Notable players

References

External links
Eurobasket.com team profile 

Basketball teams in Belgium
Sport in East Flanders
Okapi Aalster
Pro Basketball League
Basketball teams established in 1949
1949 establishments in Belgium